Loran Ellis Baker (September 21, 1905 – May 9, 1991) was a Canadian politician. He attended Bishop's College School and McGill University where he was a member of The Kappa Alpha Society. Baker was elected to the House of Commons of Canada in the election of 1945 as a Member of the Liberal Party in the riding of Shelburne—Yarmouth—Clare. He also served as Parliamentary Assistant to the Minister of National Defence, near the end of his federal political career. Prior to his federal political experience, he served in the military as a major for the Royal Canadian Artillery in Europe. He was also a councillor for Yarmouth, Nova Scotia between 1934 and 1937.

External links 

1905 births
1991 deaths
Liberal Party of Canada MPs
Bishop's College School alumni
Members of the House of Commons of Canada from Nova Scotia
People from Yarmouth, Nova Scotia
Canadian Army personnel of World War II
Royal Regiment of Canadian Artillery officers
Canadian military personnel from Nova Scotia